Brian Dwain Dahle (born September 20, 1965) is an American politician and farmer who has served as a member of the California State Senate from the 1st district since 2019. A member of the Republican Party, Dahle served as a member of the California State Assembly from the 1st district from 2012 to 2019, and as Assembly minority leader from 2017 to 2018. Before his election to the state legislature, Dahle served on the Lassen County Board of Supervisors from 1997 to 2012.

On June 4, 2019, Dahle won a special election to fill the State Senate seat vacated by Ted Gaines, who resigned after his election to the California Board of Equalization. After Dahle joined the State Senate, his wife Megan Dahle was elected to his vacated Assembly seat.

Dahle was the Republican nominee for Governor of California in 2022. He was defeated by incumbent Democrat Gavin Newsom.

Early life and education 
Descended from Tule Lake homesteaders and the son and grandson of farmers, Dahle was born in Redding and grew up in rural Lassen County. His grandfather was a World War I veteran who won his family farm in Bieber in a lottery during the Great Depression.

Dahle grew up poor with an alcoholic father and graduated from Big Valley High School in Bieber. Unable to afford college, he tried his hand at farming, but lost money in the attempt. To pay back debts, he took a job at a lumber mill, and later at hydroelectric plants. He also worked in construction for several years, including in a gold mine, and eventually began a seed business, which he owns to this day.

Career

Lassen County Board of Supervisors 
Dahle won his first election to the Lassen County Board of Supervisors in 1996, beating a popular teacher. He was reelected in 2000, 2004, and 2008. He represented District 4 on the board.

Dahle served one-year terms as chairman of the board in 1998, 2002, 2007, and 2012. He left his seat early on November 27, 2012, in order to take office in the Assembly the following week.

California State Assembly 
Dahle was first elected to the California State Assembly for the 1st district with 65% of the vote in November 2012, and reelected in 2014, 2016, and 2018. He was appointed vice chair of the Assembly Environmental and Toxic Materials Committee, the Revenue and Taxation Committee, and the Natural Resources Committee. He also served as a member of the following committees: Agriculture; Water, Parks and Wildlife; Privacy and Consumer Protection; Utilities and Commerce; Fisheries and Aquaculture; Insurance; and Business and Professions.

In 2018, Assembly Speaker Anthony Rendon appointed Dahle to the Subcommittee on Sexual Harassment Prevention and Response, which works to improve services for Capitol staff. In the Assembly, Dahle was known for writing and passing a number of bipartisan bills under Governor Jerry Brown.

Dahle's Republican colleagues elected him minority leader on August 24, 2017. He served in that role from September 16, 2017, to November 8, 2018.

Dahle resigned from the Assembly on June 12, 2019, after winning a special election to the California State Senate. His wife Megan Dahle was elected to succeed him in the Assembly in a special election.

California State Senate 
After Ted Gaines resigned, Dahle won a special election to replace him in the California State Senate and took office on June 12, 2019. He was reelected in 2020 with 57.7% of the vote.

Dahle serves as vice chair of the Senate Energy, Utilities, and Communications Committee. He also serves on the following committees: Banking and Financial Institutions; Budget and Fiscal Review; Education; Environmental Quality; and Transportation.

Caucus memberships 
 California Senate Republican Caucus
 Legislative Outdoor Sporting Caucus
 Legislative Rural Caucus

2022 California gubernatorial election 

Dahle was the Republican nominee for governor of California in the 2022 election. He placed second in the nonpartisan blanket primary, with 17.5% of the vote.

In September 2022, incumbent Democratic governor Gavin Newsom agreed to face off against Dahle in a single gubernatorial debate, sometime in late October. On October 23, Dahle and Newsom participated in a televised debate, hosted by KQED in San Francisco.

Political positions 
Dahle favors a suspension of the California gas tax to address high fuel prices, building more charging stations for electric vehicles, building the proposed Sites Reservoir project, and increasing oil production in California. He also supports rolling back parts of Proposition 47, but opposes jailing marijuana users. He has worked to stop medical patients from getting surprise medical bills from health care providers that are outside their insurance network. To reduce homelessness in California, Dahle supports building more affordable housing and tackling drug abuse. He has criticized Newsom's response to the COVID-19 pandemic and supports streamlining the path to obtaining U.S. citizenship.

Dahle has voted against bills intended to increase access to abortion and has said that abortion's legality will not change in California after the Dobbs v. Jackson Women's Health Organization ruling. He voted for a bill aimed at reducing the cost of contraceptives in California.

Dahle describes himself as a supporter of the Second Amendment. He has voted against SB 1327, legislation that allows private citizens to sue those who illegally sell assault weapons or .50 BMG rifles in California, but supports making it a felony to steal a firearm, and has voted for a bill that would make it easier to confiscate guns from convicted felons.

Personal life 
Dahle is married to Megan Dahle, who holds his former State Assembly seat. They have three children together.

Electoral history

California State Assembly

2012

2014

2016

2018

California State Senate

2019 (special)

California Governor

2022

References

External links 
 
 Twitter
 Join California Brian Dahle
 

1965 births
21st-century American politicians
County supervisors in California
Living people
Republican Party California state senators
Republican Party members of the California State Assembly
People from Lassen County, California
People from Redding, California